Humarlı is a village in the district of Kangal, Sivas Province, Turkey.

References

Villages in Kangal District